Carex reznicekii, known as Reznicek's sedge, is a species of Carex native to North America. It is a perennial.

References
It is listed as endangered within Connecticut and New York
<https://newyork.plantatlas.usf.edu/Plant.aspx?id=7142 by state authorities.

References

reznicekii
Flora of North America